The Tuscan Archipelago is a chain of islands between the Ligurian Sea and Tyrrhenian Sea, west of Tuscany, Italy.

The islands' proximity to several major cities has made them a favourite tourist location. History and literature have ensured that most people are familiar with the islands of Elba and Montecristo.

Legends says the archipelago originates from a necklace that Venus, the Roman goddess of beauty and sensuality, lost while emerging from the Tyrrhenian sea. In this myth, the seven islands are the seven pearls the goddess was unable to retrieve.

Geography
The Tuscan Archipelago lies between Corsica and the Tuscan coast and contains seven major islands (Capraia, Elba, Giannutri, Giglio, Gorgona, Montecristo and Pianosa); all are protected as part of the Arcipelago Toscano National Park.

Main Islands (from north to south):

There are several islets in the archipelago including: 

Cerboli (Piombino Channel)
Formiche di Grosseto (Grosseto)
Isola della Cappa (Giglio)
Isola Corbella (Elba)
Isola di Ortano (Elba)
Isola della Peraiola (Capraia)
Isola dei Topi (Piombino Channel)
Isole Gemini (Elba)
Isolotto della Scarpa (Pianosa)
Isolotto della Scola (Pianosa)
Palmaiola (Piombino Channel)
Scoglietto di Portoferraio (Elba)

and skerries as: 

Faraglione del Giglio
Formiche di Capraia (Capraia)
Formiche della Zanca (Elba)
Isola dei Liscoli (Elba)
Le Scole (Giglio)
Meloria Shoal (Livorno)
Scoglio d'Africa (Corsica Channel)
Scoglio Forano (Pianosa)
Scoglio del Gatto (Capraia)
Scoglio della Manza (Capraia)
Scoglio dell’Ogliera (Elba)
Scoglio del Remaiolo (Elba)
Scoglio della Triglia (Elba)
Vada Shoal (Vada)

Others islets and skerries that are not part of the archipelago:

Argentarola (Monte Argentario)
Isolotto di Porto Ercole 
Isolotto dello Sparviero
Scoglio della Focacciola

Geology

The Tuscan Archipelago represents a region of correlation between the Sardinia-Corsica block and the Italian Peninsula; it is formed by seven islands and several islets and skerries which have different geological provenance as magmatic, sedimentary and metamorphic rocks. The origin of the archipelago dates to the Triassic period according to the type of the rocks.

In the Quaternary the archipelago was related to the sea level fluctuations due to the glacial and interglacial periods; in the last glaciation the sea level fell , and Elba became a peninsula joined to the continent and to Pianosa. The Würm glaciation was followed by a warming phase, and the sea rose slowly to reach its current level.

Biodiversity

Fauna

The archipelago is distinguished by some endemic taxa which are protected in order to avoid the loss of the biodiversity of fauna and flora. The most important are Oxychilus pilula of Capraia; and Oxychilus gorgonianus of Gorgona; Coenonympha corinna, Podarcis muralis colosi and Vipera aspis francisciredi of Elba; and Vipera aspis montecristi of Montecristo. 31 species of mammals, several introduced, are known from the Tuscan archipelago, with the greatest diversity on Elba, with 24 species. The introduction of the wild boar to Elba several years ago has caused problems regarding the conservation of some plant species.

All the islands of the Tuscan Archipelago are a place where the migrant birds take a stop along their seasonal movement from north to south and vice versa; the favourite places are Gorgona, Palmaiola, Cerboli and Montecristo. The Falco peregrinus brookei nests on Elba and Capraia, the shearwater and the rare Audouin's gull are common on all the islands. The archipelago has been recognised as an Important Bird Area (IBA) by BirdLife International because it supports breeding populations of European nightjars, Scopoli's shearwaters, European shags, Audouin's gulls, Peregrine falcons, Moltoni's warblers, Marmora's warblers, Dartford warblers and black-eared wheatears.

The rich productivity of the coastal waters provides habitats for various marine life, even dolphins and whales, including fin and sperm whales.

Flora

The archipelago is characterized by a Mediterranean climate with high insolation all year round. The archipelago's flora differs from island to island; the smaller have a vegetation similar each other of macchia mediterranea and garrigue formed by evergreen plants. Elba has a complex orography including the mountain Mount Capanne which favoured the preservation of the chestnut, the holm oak and the black alder mostly on the northern side.

The main plant formations are those of shrubs of Erica, strawberry tree, Genisteae, mastic, Mediterranean buckthorn, myrtus and Phoenician juniper; On Elba and Capraia the cork oak is present, while the Aleppo pine and the maritime pine are widely spread on Elba and Gorgona.

The endemic species of the archipelago are Centaurea aetalieae (eastern Elba), Centaurea gymnocarpa (Capraia), Centaurea ilvensis (western Elba), Crocus ilvensis (western Elba), Limonium doriae (Formica Grande), Limonium gorgonae (Gorgona), Limonium ilvae (Elba), Limonium planesiae (Pianosa), Limonium sommerierianum (Giglio, Giannutri and Montecristo), Linaria capraria (all main islands except for Giannutri), Romulea insularis (Capraia) and Silene capraria (Capraia). Endemic taxa of lower rank are Biscutella pichiana subsp. ilvensis (Elba), Festuca gamisansii subsp. aethaliae (Elba), Mentha requienii subsp. bistaminata (Montecristo and Capraia) and Viola corsica subsp. ilvensis (Elba).

Islands

Elba
Elba is a Mediterranean island in Tuscany, Italy,  from the coastal town of Piombino. The largest island of the Tuscan Archipelago, Elba is also part of the Arcipelago Toscano National Park and the third largest island in Italy, after Sicily and Sardinia.

Giglio
Isola del Giglio is an Italian island and comune situated in the Tyrrhenian Sea, off the coast of Tuscany, and is part of the Province of Grosseto. The island is one of seven that form the Tuscan Archipelago, lying within the Arcipelago Toscano National Park. Giglio means "lily" in Italian, and though the name would appear consistent with the insignia of Medici Florence, it derives from Aegilium, "Goat Island", a Latin transliteration of the Greek word for "little goat" (Ancient greek: Aigýllion, Αιγύλλιον).

Capraia
Capraia  is an Italian island, is the north-westernmost of the seven islands of the Tuscan Archipelago, and the third largest after Elba and Giglio; it is also a comune (municipality) belonging to the Province of Livorno. The island has a population of about 400.

Montecristo
Montecristo  is an island in the Tyrrhenian Sea and part of the Tuscan Archipelago. Administratively it belongs to the municipality of Portoferraio in the province of Livorno, Italy. The island is a state nature reserve and forms part of the Tuscan Archipelago National Park.

Pianosa

Gorgona
Gorgona is the northernmost island in the Tuscan Archipelago. Between Corsica and Livorno, this diminutive island has been valued most for its wildlife, especially marine birds, and its isolation. The latter quality resulted in the foundation of Gorgona Abbey in the Middle Ages. After its closure, the monastery grounds and buildings were appropriated in 1869, at the foundation of an agricultural penal colony, which is currently in use.

Giannutri
Giannutri  is a small island in the Tyrrhenian Sea off the coast of Tuscany, Italy; it is the southernmost island of the Tuscan Archipelago and it is a frazione of the comune of Isola del Giglio in the Province of Grosseto.

Islets

Formiche di Grosseto
The Formiche di Grosseto ("Ants of Grosseto") is a group of islets which emerge sharply in the Tuscan Archipelago.

Palmaiola

Skerries

Meloria

Scoglietto di Portoferraio
Scoglietto di Portoferraio is a rocky skerry without vegetation placed in front of Portoferraio. It is a marine protected area since 1971, and from January 2014 it is a Site of Community Importance. On the islet is an active lighthouse.

Scoglio d'Africa
Scoglio d'Africa (or Scoglio d'Affrica), also named Formica di Monte Cristo ("Monte Cristo's Ant"), is a solitary small skerry belonging to the Tuscan Archipelago located in open sea between Tyrrhenian Sea and Corsica Channel. Administratively it belongs to the municipality of Campo nell'Elba. It is also part of the Tuscan Archipelago National Park.

Gallery

See also
 List of islands of Italy
 Arcipelago Toscano National Park
 Tuscany

References

External links

Official Tuscan Archipelago National Park website 

.
.Archipelago
Archipelagoes of Italy
Archipelagoes of the Mediterranean Sea
Ligurian Sea
Islands of the Tyrrhenian Sea
Important Bird Areas of Italy
Important Bird Areas of Mediterranean islands